A penumbral lunar eclipse took place on November 20, 2002, the last of three lunar eclipses in 2002.

Visibility

Relation to other lunar eclipses

Eclipse season 

This is the first eclipse this season.

Second eclipse this season: 4 December 2002 Total Solar Eclipse

Eclipses of 2002 
 A penumbral lunar eclipse on May 26.
 An annular solar eclipse on June 10.
 A penumbral lunar eclipse on June 24.
 A penumbral lunar eclipse on November 20.
 A total solar eclipse on December 4.

It is the first of four lunar year cycles, repeating every 354 days.

Saros series 
It is part of Saros series 116.

Metonic series 
 First eclipse: November 20, 2002.
 Second eclipse: November 19, 2021.
 Third eclipse: November 18, 2040.
 Fourth eclipse: November 19, 2059.
 Fifth eclipse: November 19, 2078.

Half-Saros cycle
A lunar eclipse will be preceded and followed by solar eclipses by 9 years and 5.5 days (a half saros). This lunar eclipse is related to two partial solar eclipses of Solar Saros 123.

Tritos series 
 Preceded: Lunar eclipse of December 21, 1991
 Followed: Lunar eclipse of October 18, 2013

Tzolkinex 
 Preceded: Lunar eclipse of October 17, 1995
 Followed: Lunar eclipse of December 31, 2009

See also 
List of lunar eclipses
List of 21st-century lunar eclipses

References

External links 
 Saros cycle 116
 

2002-11
2002 in science